The Cosmic Jokers is an album by a krautrock supergroup The Cosmic Jokers. It is a compilation of jam sessions by various Cosmic Couriers musicians, specifically Klaus Schulze, Harald Grosskopf, Manuel Göttsching, Dieter Dierks and Jürgen Dollase.

Track listing

References

1974 albums